Love and Poison (Italian: Amori e veleni) is a 1950 Italian historical adventure film directed by Giorgio Simonelli and starring Amedeo Nazzari, Lois Maxwell and Marisa Merlini. It was released in America in 1952, and is sometimes dated by that year. The film was shot at the Cinecittà Studios in Rome.

Set in the mid-seventeenth century, it portrays a romance between Queen Christina of Sweden and an Italian during her stay in Rome.

Cast
 Amedeo Nazzari as Franco Santinelli  
 Lois Maxwell as Queen Christina  
 Marisa Merlini as Orsola  
 Olga Solbelli as Domitilla Baglioni  
 Giulio Donnini as Gelasio Baglioni  
 Massimo Sallusti as Carlo  
 Anna Nievo as Annamaria Di Cerri  
 Alfredo Varelli as Egidio d'Alvernia  
 Afro Poli as Duke Di Cerri  
 Italia Marchesini as Astrologa  
 Cesare Fantoni 
 Oscar Andriani 
 Ave Ninchi 
 Armando Furlai 
 Corrado Nardi 
 Riccardo Foti 
 Lia Murano 
 Amina Pirani Maggi 
 Checco Durante 
 Achille Togliani 
 Greta Mandrà 
 Claudio Giammi

References

Bibliography
 Poppi, Roberto. I registi: dal 1930 ai giorni nostri. Gremese Editore, 2002.

External links

1950 films
1950s Italian-language films
Films directed by Giorgio Simonelli
1950s historical adventure films
Italian historical adventure films
Films set in the 17th century
Films set in Rome
Cultural depictions of Christina, Queen of Sweden
Films shot at Cinecittà Studios
Italian black-and-white films
1950s Italian films